Talıstan (also, Talystan) is a village and municipality in the Ismailli Rayon of Azerbaijan.  It has a population of 2,183.

References 

Populated places in Azerbaijan
Populated places in Ismayilli District